Winchfield railway station is located in the small village of Winchfield and also serves Hartley Wintney and surrounding villages and towns such as Odiham and Whitehall in Hampshire, England.

The station is served by 2 trains per hour in each direction during the off-peak hours Monday to Saturday with additional trains during weekday peak hours. On Sundays, trains run once an hour in either direction from the station.

History
The London and South Western Railway (then London and Southampton railway) built a line from London to Southampton via Basingstoke. The railway arrived from Woking on 24 September 1838, and Winchfield station was opened as Shapley Heath as a temporary terminus. On 10 June the following year, the line was completed to Basingstoke and Shapley Heath became a through station. It was soon renamed as Winchfield after the village; the precise date of this is unknown, but it occurred by November 1840.

As with Hook and Farnborough Main, there is a wide gap between the platforms and their tracks. Originally an island platform stood in between them, but these have been removed. When the station was expanded so this platform could be built, one of the platforms was removed and rebuilt further away. Consequently, the current platforms have different style canopies.

Notes

References

External links

Railway stations in Hampshire
DfT Category D stations
Former London and South Western Railway stations
Railway stations in Great Britain opened in 1838
Railway stations served by South Western Railway